Bactrocera correcta is a species of tephritid fruit flies that is widely distributed in Southeast Asia. It is a serious pest species with a broad host range and has caused major infestations in Vietnam and Thailand.

Similar species
It is similar to B. dorsalis in color pattern, but has transverse facial spots and an incomplete costal band. It also resembles B. penecorrecta.

References
Drew, R.A.I. & Raghu, S. (2002). The fruit fly fauna (Diptera: Tephritidae: Dacinae) of the rainforest habitat of the Western Ghats, India. The Raffles Bulletin of Zoology 50(2):327-352. PDF (with description of B. correcta, and key to Indian Bactrocera species)

Further reading
 Allwood, A.J., Chinajariyawong, A., Drew, R.A.I., et al. (1999) Host plant records for fruit flies (Diptera: Tephritidae) in south east Asia. ''Raffles Bulletin of Zoology Supplement 7:1-92.

correcta
Insects described in 1916
Agricultural pest insects
Insects of Thailand